St. François Atoll is one of two atolls of the Alphonse Group in the Seychelles that are part of the Outer Islands.

Geography
St. François Atoll lies 403 km south of Victoria, Seychelles. The atoll is uninhabited and has two islands, St. François and Bijoutier Island.

St. François Island
St. Francois is easily accessible at less than 30 minutes distance by boat from Alphonse.

Bijoutier Island
The northern and smaller island takes its name from the French word bijoutier, meaning "jeweller". The island is only accessible by boat during high tide. The island is small enough that it takes only a few minutes to walk completely around it.

History
In 1562 the whole of the Alphonse Group (Alphonse, St. François and Bijoutier) were collectively named on Portuguese charts as San Francisco. This might explain how St. François was given its name. Chevalier Alphonse de Pontevez commanding the French frigate Le Lys visited on 28 June 1730 and named St François possibly following the Portuguese name for the group. Some sources (giving the incorrect date for the visit) claim it was to commemorate the religious feast of St Francis de Sales of 29 January.
The origin of the name of Bijoutier island is unknown.  
A feature of St. François Atoll is the number of shipwrecks, standing as grim reminders of the perils of the sea. 
St. François island once supported a population of a handful of men engaged in harvesting coconuts but the plantation was never productive.

Flora and fauna
In 2007, Island Conservation Society established a conservation center on Alphonse to manage conservation on the island and on neighboring St. François.

There is a small breeding population of 13 pairs of black-naped tern. A small colony of tropical shearwater was rediscovered in 2013, the first confirmed breeding record since the 1950s. Migratory bird numbers are huge and include globally significant numbers of crab plover and Saunders's tern. Seychelles’ largest concentrations of Eurasian whimbrel, ruddy turnstone and grey plover have also been recorded here. The only land bird is the house sparrow and this is its most southerly outpost in Seychelles. Significant numbers of hawksbill turtles and green turtles nest on St François and Bijoutier, and the waters of the atoll provide important foraging habitat for immature turtles of both species.

Transport
The islands can be reached by boat from Alphonse.

Image gallery

References

External links 

 Seychelles Bird Records Committee
 Island Conservation Society
 National Bureau of Statistics
 Info on the island
 2010 Sailing directions
 Resort

Atolls of Seychelles
Outer Islands (Seychelles)